The 2021 NCAA Division I Tennis Championships was the men's and women's tennis tournaments played concurrently from May 7 to May 28, 2021 at campus sites and Orlando, Florida at the USTA National Campus. It was the 75th edition of the NCAA Division I Men's Tennis Championship and the 39th edition of the NCAA Division I Women's Tennis Championship.

Men's team championship

National seeds

1.  Florida (National Champions)
2.  Baylor (Runner-up)
3.  Tennessee (semifinals)
4.  Texas (semifinals)

5.  Virginia  (round of 16)
6.  North Carolina  (round of 16)
7.  TCU  (quarterfinals)
8.  Texas A&M (quarterfinals) 

9.  UCF  (second round)
10.  Wake Forest  (second round)
11.  Georgia  (quarterfinals)
12.  USC  (quarterfinals)

13.  South Carolina (round of 16)
14.  Kentucky (second round)
15.  Ole Miss  (round of 16)
16.  Illinois (round of 16)

Bracket

Notes

Bracket source:

Women's team championship

National seeds

1.  North Carolina (semifinals)
2.  Texas (National Champions)
3.  Georgia (quarterfinals)
4.  UCLA (quarterfinals)

5.  Pepperdine  (Runner-up)
6.  NC State  (semifinals)
7.  Florida State  (quarterfinals)
8.  Baylor (second round)

9.  UCF   (round of 16)
10.  Texas A&M   (round of 16)
11.  Florida  (second round)
12.  LSU (second round)

13.  Georgia Tech (round of 16)
14.  Virginia (round of 16)
15.  Ohio State  (round of 16)
16.  California (round of 16)

Bracket

Bracket source:

Men's singles championship

National seeds

  Liam Draxl, Kentucky 
  Daniel Rodrigues, South Carolina
  Hady Habib, Texas A&M
  Valentin Vacherot, Texas A&M 
  Duarte Vale, Florida
  Sam Riffice, Florida (National Champion) 
  Johannus Monday, Tennessee
  Gabriel Décamps, UCF

Players ranked 9th–16th, listed by last name
  Trent Bryde, Georgia
  Gabriel Diallo, Kentucky 
  Luc Fomba, TCU
  Alastair Gray, TCU
  Finn Reynolds, Ole Miss
  Matías Soto, Baylor
  Henri Squire, Wake Forest
  Adam Walton, Tennessee

Draw

Finals

Section 1

Section 2

Section 3

Section 4

Women's singles championship

National seeds

  Sara Daavettila, North Carolina 
  Estela Pérez Somarriba, Miami (FL) 
  Emma Navarro, Virginia (National Champion)
  Katarina Jokić, Georgia
  Kenya Jones, Georgia Tech
  Anna Rogers, NC State
  Abigail Forbes, UCLA
  McCartney Kessler, Florida

Players ranked 9th–16th, listed by last name
  Carolyn Campana, Wake Forest
  Victoria Flores, Georgia Tech
  Viktoriya Kanapatskaya, Syracuse
  Katarina Kozarov, Furman
  Alexa Noel, Iowa
  Giulia Pairone, Florida State
  Isabella Pfennig, Miami (FL)
  Natasha Subhash, Virginia

Draw

Finals

Section 1

Section 2

Section 3

Section 4

Men's doubles championship

National seeds

  Finn Reynolds /  Tim Sandkaulen, Ole Miss
  William Blumberg /  Brian Cernoch, North Carolina
  Pat Harper /  Adam Walton, Tennessee (National Champions)
  Luc Fomba /  Alastair Gray, TCU

Players ranked 5th–8th, listed by institution
  Constantin Frantzen /  Sven Lah, Baylor
  Trent Bryde /  Tyler Zink, Georgia
  César Bourgois /  Gabriel Diallo, Kentucky
  Trey Hilderbrand /  Bogdan Pavel, UCF

Draw

Finals

Top half

Bottom half

Women's doubles championship

National seeds

  Fiona Arrese /  Akvilė Paražinskaitė, Kentucky
  Sara Daavettila /  Cameron Morra, North Carolina
  Victoria Flores /  Kenya Jones, Georgia Tech
  Makenna Jones /  Elizabeth Scotty, North Carolina (National Champions)

Players ranked 5th–8th, listed by institution
  Chloe Beck /  Karolína Beránková, Duke
  McCartney Kessler /  Marlee Zein, Florida
  Ariana Arseneault /  Katarina Jokić, Georgia
  Jaeda Daniel /  Adriana Reami, NC State

Draw

Finals

Top half

Bottom half

References

NCAA Division I tennis championships
NCAA Division I Tennis Championships
NCAA Division I Tennis Championships
NCAA Division I Tennis Championships
NCAA Division I Tennis Championships
NCAA Division I Tennis Championships
NCAA Division I Tennis Championships
NCAA Division I Tennis Championships
NCAA Division I Tennis Championships
NCAA Division I Tennis Championships
NCAA Division I Tennis Championships
NCAA Division I Tennis Championships
NCAA Division I Tennis Championships
NCAA Division I Tennis Championships
NCAA Division I Tennis Championships